Edgar Brown may refer to:

Edgar Allan Brown (1888–1975), legislator from South Carolina
Edgar William Brown (1859–1917), American physician and businessmen
Edgar George Brown (1898–1954), American tennis player, union organizer, and politician
Edgar O. Brown (1880–1937), American football coach
Edgar H. Brown (1926–2021), American mathematician

See also
Edgar Brown Memorial Stadium, a high school stadium in Washington